Som Livre (Portuguese for "Free Sound") is a Brazilian record company that was founded in March 1969 in order to commercialize the soundtracks for Rede Globo (its then parent company) soap operas. It later expanded to recording studio albums.

Today, Som Livre is Brazil's largest domestic label and was formerly part of Grupo Globo, which is the biggest media conglomerate in Brazil. In November 2020, Globo placed the label up for sale. In April 2021, it was acquired by Sony Music Entertainment for an undisclosed amount. The sale was approved by the national competition regulator Cade on 4 November 2021 and was completed on 4 March 2022.

History 
Som Livre was founded in March 1969 by music producer João Araújo. It was founded with the purpose of developing and commercializing soap opera soundtracks produced by TV Globo. Its first telenovela soundtrack was O Cafona (1971). Other notable soundtracks produced by the label include: O Bem-Amado, O Bofe, O Primeiro Amor (The First Love), O Espigão (The Spike), Corrida do Ouro (The Gold Rush), Os Ossos do Barão (The Bones of the Baron), and O Rebu.

In the early 1970s, the label partnered with Sonopresse, Disques Carrere, and Disques Trema to release music videos in Brazil. In 1974, Som Livre created the "SOMA" label with the intention of developing more affordable albums. Som Livre began collaborations with musical artists Djavan and Rita Lee in 1976. Other musical artist collaborators included: Guilherme Arantes, Tim Maia, Lulu Santos, Barão Vermelho, Cazuza, Luiz Melodia, Gal Costa, Simone, Jorge Ben Jor, Renata Vasconcellos, Elis Regina, Fafá de Belém, Moraes Moreira, Djavan, Novos Baianos, Fábio Jr., Agepê, Francis Hime, and Xuxa. In 1988, the label produced Xuxa’s third album “Xou da Xuxa 3,” which was the best selling album in Som Livre’s history with 3,316,704 copies sold.

In 1999, the company started selling its products online, reaching R$1.342 million in sales within four months. Som Livre was the first Brazilian record label to release cell phone ringtones.

In 2007, Som Livre released its SLAP label, which focused on signing on new Brazilian talent. New artists collaborations included: Latin Grammy-nominated Maria Gadú and Michel Teló, Tiago Iorc, and Little Joy. In celebration of its 5-year anniversary, SLAP hosted a music festival at Cine Jóia in São Paulo. The festival featured: Maria Gadú, Silva, Thaís Gulin, Tiago Iorc, Ana Canãs, Dani Black, and Jesuton and Marcelo Jeneci.

In 2014, Som Livre partnered with Eagle Rock Entertainment, signing onto international artists such as The Rolling Stones and Elton John. In 2016, the label launched its Austro Music label, dedicated to electronic music. Austro Music has worked with DJ DIB, Elefantz, Naza Brothers, and WAO.

With the rise in streaming service popularity, Som Livre partnered with Deezer, Spotify, Apple Music, and Globoplay. With Spotify, the two companies developed a new component through app which paired 27 iconic telenovela characters to their respective soundtrack. In 2018, the label worked with Apple Music to stream its music on Apple's platform. Som Livre’s partnership with Globoplay led to an "on demand" service, in which the label released artist content exclusively for its subscribers.

Gospel 
Som Livre was the first record label to invest in Brazil’s gospel music market. In 2009, Som Livre released its first gospel album “CD Promessas,” which sold 500,000 copies. The following year, the label launched Festival Promessas, the biggest evangelical music event in Brazil.

According to the Brazilian Association of Record Producers (ABPD), gospel music was the second most popular musical genre in Brazil in 2011. In 2012, Som Livre launched "Você Adora", a gospel subdivision of the label. Amongst Você Adora’s gospel artists are Ludmila Ferber, David Quinlan, Rose Nascimento, André Valadão, Eliane Silva, Davi Sacer, and Ton Carfi.

Labels 
Austro Music
SLAP
Soma
Diretoria Funk
Inbraza
Sigem

Som Livre Masters series 
Som Livre commissioned Charles Gavin to select 25 rare albums for inclusion in their Som Livre Masters Series of CD reissues. The albums:

Sambas – Dom Júnior, Walter Wanderley, Milton Banana
Bossa nova, nova bossa – Manfredo Fest
Bossa Jazz Trio – Bossa Jazz Trio
Sansa Trio – Sansa Trio
Os Brazões – Os Brazões
Em Som Maior – Sambrasa Trio
Sambossa 5
Quarteto Bossamba – Walter Wanderley
Reencontro com Sambalanço Trio  – Sambalanço Trio
Som 3 – Cesar Camargo Mariano
Os Sambistas – Paulinho da Viola
Decisão – Zimbo Trio
Brazilian Octopus – Hermeto Pascoal
Com Dizia O Poeta – Vinicius de Moraes, Marília Medalha, Toquinho
 E deixa o relógio andar – Osmar Milito
Rosinha de Valença – Rosinha de Valença
Molhado de Suor  – Alceu Valença
Vila Sésamo
 Vamos pro Mundo – Novos Baianos
Gerson Conrad e Zeze Motta
Sítio do Picapau Amarelo
Tim Maia – Tim Maia
Vontade De Rever Você – Marcos Valle
Nave Maria – Tom Zé
Línguas De Fogo – Sidney Miller

''Gustavo So Para Baixinhos - Gustavo Sibilio Borges

Artists

Amigos
Anezzi
Bhaskar
Bivolt
Carol & Vitoria
César Menotti e Fabiano
Céu
Cleber & Cauan
Costa Gold
Davi Sacer
Edi Rock
Edu Chociay
Erasmo Carlos
Filipe Ret
Gaab
Gustavo Bertoni
Gustavo Sibilio Borges
Haikass
Hugo & Guilherme
Inbraza
Israel & Rodolffo
Jads & Jadson
Jefferson Moraes
João Bosco
João Cavalcanti
João Neto & Frederico
Jonas Esticado
Jonathan Ferr
Jorge & Mateus
Kafé
Kekel
Kevin o Chris
Laila Garin
Lexa
Los Pantchos
Lu & Alex
Luiza & Maurílio
Luthuly
Maiara & Maraisa
Mano Walter
Marcelo Jeneci
Maria Gadú
Mariana Fagundes
Marília Mendonça
Matheus Fernandes
May & Karen
Menos É Mais
Michel Teló
Mojjo
Naiara Azevedo
Ney Matogrosso
Nicolas Germano
Novos Baianos
Onze:20
Raça Negra
Raí Saia Rodada
Ralk
Rayane & Rafaela
Roberto Menescal
Samhara
Scalene
Thiaguinho
Tiee
Ton Carfi
Welington & Nillo
Wesley Safadão
Xand Avião
Zé Felipe
Zé Maria 
Zé Neto & Cristiano

References

External links 
 Som Livre 
 Dicogs entry

Brazilian record labels
 
IFPI members
Sony Music
2021 mergers and acquisitions